The Big I Am is a British gangster film starring Michael Madsen and Leo Gregory which was released straight to DVD on 12 April 2010.

Plot 
"A cruel twist of fate catapults small time crook Mickey Skinner into the big league, as head of a brutal London gang, poised on the brink of a lucrative deal."

Cast 
 Leo Gregory as Skinner 
 Michael Madsen as Martell 
 Vincent Regan as Barber 
 Robert Fucilla as Floyd 
 Steven Berkoff as The MC 
 Beatrice Rosen as Liza 
 Paul Kaye as Keys 
 Phil Davis as Stubbs 
 MC Harvey as Robbo
 Joel Beckett as Johnny

Production 
The film was shot in areas of South Wales, including Cardiff and Caldicot, Monmouthshire.

References

External links 

2010 films
British crime films
2010 crime films
2010s English-language films
2010s British films